Vacuolar protein sorting-associated protein 11 homolog is a protein that in humans is encoded by the VPS11 gene.

Function 

Vesicle mediated protein sorting plays an important role in segregation of intracellular molecules into distinct organelles. Genetic studies in yeast have identified more than 40 vacuolar protein sorting (VPS) genes involved in vesicle transport to vacuoles. This gene encodes the human homolog of yeast class C Vps11 protein. The mammalian class C Vps proteins are predominantly associated with late endosomes/lysosomes, and like their yeast counterparts, may mediate vesicle trafficking steps in the endosome/lysosome pathway.

Interactions 

VPS11 has been shown to interact with VPS18, VPS33A and STX7.

References

Further reading